Blerina  is a subtribe of hoverfly in the family Syrphidae.

Genera
Blera Billberg, 1820
Caliprobola Rondani, 1845
Cynorhinella Curran, 1922
Lejota Rondani, 1857
Philippimyia Shannon, 1926
Somula Macquart, 1847

References

Eristalinae
Diptera of South America
Diptera of North America
Diptera of Asia
Diptera of Europe
Insect subtribes